Linda Helen Smith (29 January 1958 – 27 February 2006) was an English comedian and comedy writer. She appeared regularly on Radio 4 panel games, and was voted "Wittiest Living Person" by listeners in 2002. From 2004 to 2006 she was head of the British Humanist Association.

Life and career
Smith was born in Erith, Kent in 1958 and was educated at Erith College of Technology (now Bexley College) and at the University of Sheffield where she graduated in English and Drama. She joined a professional theatre company before turning to comedy. In 1987, she won the Hackney Empire New Act of the Year, then known as the New London Comic Award, and performed on the Edinburgh Fringe before breaking into radio comedy.

Many of her early stand-up appearances were benefit concerts staged in solidarity with the British miners during the Miners' Strike in the 1980s. She was a lifelong socialist.

Her first appearances on national radio were on Radio 5's The Treatment in 1997. She was subsequently a regular panellist on The News Quiz and Just a Minute and appeared frequently on I'm Sorry I Haven't a Clue (from June 2001 onwards), Have I Got News for You, Mock the Week, Countdown and QI. She wrote and starred in her own Radio 4 sitcom, Linda Smith's A Brief History of Timewasting. After appearing on Radio 4's Devout Sceptics to discuss her beliefs she was asked by the British Humanist Association (BHA) to become president of the society, a role that she occupied with commitment from 2004 until her death. In 2002, she was voted 'Wittiest Living Person' by listeners to BBC Radio 4's Word of Mouth. In his 2003 book Classic Radio Comedy, Mat Coward called Smith "the funniest woman on radio today".

On 17 November 2003, Smith appeared on the BBC television show Room 101, where she successfully managed to put in "adults who read Harry Potter books", Tim Henman, "Back to School signs that appear in shops" and "posh people". However, she failed to put in Bow ties after host Paul Merton pointed out that Stan Laurel regularly wore a bow tie.

Illness, death and legacy
On 27 February 2006, Smith died as a consequence of ovarian cancer at the age of 48. She had been diagnosed with ovarian cancer three-and-a-half years earlier but, not wanting to be thought of as a patient or a victim, she did not want people to know. Before she died she chose that her funeral be humanist and her memorial at the Theatre Royal, Stratford East, on 10 March, was dedicated to the British Humanist Association. Her life and work were honoured at the British Academy Television Awards in 2006. The first episode of Dawn French's Girls Who Do: Comedy was dedicated to the memory of Linda Smith. A tribute edition of The News Quiz featuring clips of Linda's appearances and personal memories of her from other panellists was broadcast on BBC Radio 4 on 3 March 2006, hosted by Simon Hoggart.

Two tribute gigs were held in her memory in 2006. The first took place on 14 May at the Lyceum Theatre, Sheffield, In Praise of an English Radical, the second on 4 June at the Victoria Palace Theatre in London entitled Tippy Top: An Evening of Linda Smith's Favourite Things. In August 2006, Andy Hamilton presented a BBC Radio 4 tribute entitled Linda Smith: A Modern Radio Star. An anthology on CD, entitled I Think the Nurses Are Stealing My Clothes: The Very Best of Linda Smith, was released in November 2006 as was a book with the same name. A tribute show of the same name was aired on BBC Radio 4 on 10 November 2006. Smith's sell-out stage show Wrap Up Warm has been available on CD since November 2006.

Linda Smith was working on a third series of A Brief History of Timewasting before she became incapacitated by her illness. As a tribute the online radio station BBC 7 ran the previous two series, the first all on one day.

The University of Kent holds The Linda Smith Collection as the foundation of the British Stand-Up Comedy Archive. It includes notes, diaries, scripts, audio-visual recordings, photographs, press cuttings, correspondence and publicity material covering her entire life and career. It was deposited at the University of Kent by Linda's partner Warren Lakin in 2013.

A gig called "Loving Linda" took place in 2018 to raise money to combat the cancer that took her life.

In 2019 Chortle published a list of 12 of Linda's best jokes to mark her birthday.

Personal life
She met her partner, Warren Lakin, at university, and they were together for nearly 30 years until her death.

Books
 Sit-Down Comedy (contributor to anthology, ed Malcolm Hardee & John Fleming) Ebury Press/Random House, 2003. ;

References

External links

A Brief History of Timewasting BBC Radio 4
Anarchist with attitude (interview) by Laurie Taylor New Humanist, 6 September 2004
Radio comedian Linda Smith dies BBC News, 28 February 2006
Obituary: Linda Smith BBC News, 28 February 2006
Jeremy Hardy pays tribute BBC News, 28 February 2006
Obituary by Mark Steel The Independent, 1 March 2006
Obituary by Jeremy Hardy, containing many biographical details The Guardian, 1 March 2006
News Quiz colleagues pay tribute The Guardian, 2 March 2006
Linda Smith: God, the biggest joke of all The Independent, 2 March 2006
President of the British Humanist Association, 2004 – 2006 British Humanist Association
The Linda Smith Collection University of Kent

Video
Linda Smith talking about Just a Minute BBC2, Arena, 26 December 2005 (RealVideo)

Audio
Linda Smith explores Auvergne & Corsica BBC Radio 4, 12 April 2005
The Limited Power of Satire/Linda's Rise from Obscurity BBC Radio 4, The News Quiz, 7 September 2005
Linda Smith has her eye on the Chairman's seat BBC Radio 4, The News Quiz, 6 February 2006
Interview with Jenny Colgan, containing tribute BBC Radio 4, Woman's Hour, 1 March 2006

1958 births
2006 deaths
Alumni of the University of Sheffield
English radio people
Deaths from cancer in England
Deaths from ovarian cancer
English atheists
English humanists
English socialists
People from Erith
English women comedians
English comedy writers
20th-century English comedians
21st-century English comedians